Dottie is a novel by Abdulrazak Gurnah published by Jonathan Cape in 1990. It is Gurnah's third novel.

Unlike most of Gurnah's protagonists, the eponymous Dottie Badoura Fatma Balfour, who is born in Leeds, England, is not from Zanzibar. Dottie grows up poor, in a family of "ambiguously mixed origins". The novel describes her struggle to serve as a parent for her brother and sister after her mother dies.

Dottie alludes to the works of Charles Dickens, particularly David Copperfield and Great Expectations.

References

Sources 
 

 

1990 novels
Books by Abdulrazak Gurnah
Jonathan Cape books